Midsommar is a 2019 folk horror film written and directed by Ari Aster. The film stars Florence Pugh and Jack Reynor as a dysfunctional couple who travel to Sweden with a group of friends for a midsummer festival, only to find themselves in the clutches of a sinister cult practicing Scandinavian paganism. Supporting actors include William Jackson Harper, Vilhelm Blomgren, Ellora Torchia, Archie Madekwe and Will Poulter.

A co-production between the United States and Sweden, the film was initially pitched to Aster as a straightforward slasher film set among Swedish cultists. While elements of the original concept remain in the final product, the film's plot centers on a deteriorating relationship, inspired by a difficult breakup which Aster himself experienced. The soundtrack, composed by British electronic musician Bobby Krlic (better known as The Haxan Cloak), takes inspiration from Nordic folk music. The film was shot on location in Budapest in the summer and autumn of 2018.

Midsommar was theatrically released in the United States on July 3, 2019, by A24 and in Sweden on July 10, 2019, by Nordisk Film. The film grossed $48 million and received critical acclaim, with praise for Aster's direction and Pugh's performance in particular, although it polarized general audiences.

Plot
American psychology student Dani Ardor is left deeply traumatized after her sister commits a murder-suicide by filling the house with carbon monoxide, killing herself and their parents. The incident further strains Dani's relationship with her increasingly distant boyfriend of four years, cultural anthropology student, Christian. As summer approaches, she learns that Christian and fellow students Mark and Josh have been invited by their Swedish friend Pelle to attend a midsummer festival at his ancestral commune, the Hårga, in rural Hälsingland, Sweden. The festival occurs only once every 90 years, and Josh, who is writing his thesis on European midsummer festivities, regards it as a once-in-a-lifetime opportunity. Christian had not discussed the trip with Dani, as he intended to break up with her before the tragedy with her family. After an argument, he reluctantly invites her along.

Upon arrival at the commune, they meet Simon and Connie, a couple from London who were invited by Pelle's communal brother Ingemar. He offers the group psychedelic mushrooms, and Dani has a bad trip, hallucinating about her dead family. The day after their arrival, the group witnesses an ättestupa ceremony, where two elders commit suicide by jumping from a cliff onto the rocks below. When one of the elders survives the fall, the commune members mimic his wails of pain, and promptly mercy-kill him by bludgeoning his skull with a mallet. Commune elder, Siv, attempts to calm Connie and Simon by explaining that every member of their community does this at the age of 72 and believes it to be a great honor.

Christian also decides to write his thesis on the Hårga commune, irritating Josh for plagiarizing his idea. Bothered by the ceremonies, Dani attempts to leave, but is convinced to stay by Pelle. He explains that he too was orphaned after his parents perished in a fire, and the commune became his new family. Connie and Simon demand to leave and are supposedly driven to a nearby train station one at a time. During his thesis research, Christian is told that to avoid incest, outsiders are sometimes brought into the commune for "mating" purposes. He is propositioned and encouraged to participate, but refuses. After unwittingly urinating on a sacred tree, Mark is lured away from the group by one of the female commune members. That night, Josh sneaks out of bed to secretly photograph one of the commune's sacred texts, despite being forbidden by an elder from doing so. Josh has his head bludgeoned and dragged away when he is caught and distracted by a man wearing the skinned face of Mark's corpse.

The following day, both Dani and Christian are separately coerced into taking a hallucinogenic drink. Dani wins a maypole dancing competition and is crowned May Queen. Afterward, Christian is drugged and participates in a copulation ritual designed to impregnate Maja, a young member of the Hårga, while older nude female members watch and mimic Maja's moans. Dani witnesses the ritual and has a panic attack while the commune's women surround her, mimicking her cries of sorrow. After the ritual, a nude Christian tries to flee. He discovers Josh's severed leg planted in a flowerbed and Simon's corpse on display in a barn after being subjected to a blood eagle. Christian is then paralyzed by an elder.

For the final ceremony, the commune leaders explain that the commune must offer nine human sacrifices to purge it of its evil. The first four victims (Mark, Josh, Simon, and Connie) are outsiders lured to them by Pelle and Ingemar, while the next four victims must be from the commune. As May Queen, Dani must choose either Christian or a commune member to be the final sacrifice. She chooses Christian, who is stuffed into a disemboweled brown bear's body and placed in a triangular wooden temple alongside other sacrifices. The commune members to be sacrificed are given drugs and told it will prevent them from feeling fear or suffering, but Christian is not and remains unable to move. The structure is set alight, and the commune members mimic the screams and wails of agony of those being burned alive. Dani initially sobs in horror and grief, but then she gradually begins to smile.

Cast

Production

Development 

In May 2018, it was announced that Ari Aster would write and direct the film, with Lars Knudsen serving as producer. B-Reel Films, a Swedish company, produced the film alongside Square Peg, with A24 distributing. Aster's previous horror film, Hereditary, had been a huge critical success, making over $80 million to become A24's highest-grossing film worldwide. According to Aster, he had been approached by B-Reel executives Martin Karlqvist and Patrik Andersson to helm a slasher film set in Sweden, an idea which he initially rejected as he felt he "had no way into the story." Aster ultimately devised a plot in which the two central characters are experiencing relationship tensions verging on a breakup, and wrote the surrounding screenplay around this theme. He described the result as "a breakup movie dressed in the clothes of a folk horror film." Aster has mentioned 1981 Albert Brooks film Modern Romance as an inspiration for Midsommar, and also called it "The Wizard of Oz for perverts".

Aster worked with the film's production designer Henrik Svensson to develop the film's folklore elements and the traditions of the Hårga, while visiting Hälsingland together. He researched Hälsingegårds, "centuries-old farms that typically had painting on the walls", to develop a stylized version for the set, as well as midsummer celebrations in Swedish, German and English folklore. Aster also researched spiritual movements and communities, saying he particularly drew inspiration from Rudolf Steiner's anthroposophy and the theosophy movement.

Florence Pugh, Jack Reynor, Will Poulter, Vilhem Blomgren, William Jackson Harper, Ellora Torchia, and Archie Madekwe joined the cast in July 2018.

Filming 
Some early scenes set in the United States were also filmed there; Dani's apartment was filmed in Brooklyn, New York City, as is the location in the film, whilst other scenes where Christian's friends interact were filmed in Utah. The majority of the film was shot in Hungary rather than Sweden, primarily due to financial constraints, but also as Sweden limits daily film shoots to no longer than 8 hours. Principal photography began on July 30, 2018 in Budapest, and wrapped in October 2018.

Harper said the shoot was "arduous" due to the heat. Wasps were highly abundant and a major issue on set. Pugh reflected "the shoot was totally nuts" and commended Aster's direction: "he was dealing with possibly 100, 120 people, additional extras and actors there, all speaking in three different languages and he was the captain of the ship".

Ahead of filming the drug use scenes, Reynor said that the cast discussed their own experiences with psychedelic mushrooms. On her breakdown scene with the Hårga, Pugh commended the other women involved, saying they "made this scene possible" as she typically struggles to cry on camera. She reflected: "I knew I would never be so open and so raw and so exhausted like I was that day ever again". 

The sex scene between Christian and Maja was shot on the final day. Reynor said he spent time attempting to boost morale among the other cast members involved, none of whom spoke English, including Isabelle Grill (Maja) who was appearing in her first feature film role. He reflected he felt male nudity was unusual for a horror film, where female nudity is more typical. He said that he "advocated for as much full-frontal nudity as possible, I really wanted to embrace the feeling of being exposed and the humiliation of this character. And I felt really, really vulnerable, more than I had actually even anticipated.”

Props and costume design 
Svensson said that the mallet prop used for the senicide scene was a replica of one at a museum in Stockholm, and that the cliff-jumping was based on historic practices in Sweden. Costume designer Andrea Flesch developed the Hårga's costumes with antique linen from Hungary and Romania, and buttons from Sweden. Aster asked for the clothing to appear handmade, and for the Hårga to dress in white. Many of their costumes were hand embroidered with rune designs unique to individual community members, and signifying their families and occupations. Murals and tapestries in the background of some scenes indicate events in the film.

In April 2020, A24 announced it would be auctioning off props from its films and television series, including the 10,000-silk-flower May Queen dress worn by Florence Pugh, which was reportedly purchased by the Academy Museum of Motion Pictures for $65,000, after both Ariana Grande and Halsey had expressed interest on social media. The proceeds were donated to provide COVID-19 pandemic relief for firefighters and their families. Other items from the film that sold at auction were the bear headdress worn by Jack Reynor for $4,760, the mallet used to crush a cult member's skull for $10,000, and other villager costumes that sold in the $4,500 range. All the proceeds from the Midsommar collection raised over $100,000 for the FDNY Foundation.

Post-production 
Aster said that the visual effects for the psychedelic scenes involved considerable trial and error: "I'm sure for some of those shots we got to the point where we had 60 versions. In one iteration the tripping was way too distracting and you're not paying attention to the characters, and then you brought it down to the point where if you are paying attention to the characters, you'll never notice the tripping effects." The more minimal visual effects were settled on a week before the first screening.

There was around a six-week debate as to whether the film would be given an NC-17 or R rating by the MPAA for its US release due to its graphic nudity, with it eventually being given an R rating after cuts; an NC-17 rating is considered harmful to films' box office performance.

Music 

Aster wrote the film while listening to British electronic musician The Haxan Cloak's 2013 album Excavation. Aster later recruited him to compose the film's score, credited under his real name Bobby Krlic. Krlic began composing the music before filming began, taking inspiration from Nordic folk music, and collaborating closely with Aster. The film makes use of diegetic music, where events on screen meld with the score.

The soundtrack album was released on July 5, 2019 via Milan Records.

Release
Midsommar had a pre-release screening at the Alamo Drafthouse Cinema in New York City, on June 18, 2019. The film was theatrically released in the United States on July 3, 2019.

Director's cut
Aster's original 171-minute cut of the film, which A24 asked Aster to trim down for a wide theatrical release, had its world premiere at the Film Society of Lincoln Center in New York City on August 20, 2019. It was shown in theaters across the United States for a weekend starting on August 29, 2019. The director's cut was released as an Apple TV exclusive on September 24, 2019. On physical media, it saw a British release on Blu-ray and DVD on October 28, 2019, an Australian Blu-ray release on November 6, 2019 and a US release on Blu-ray in July 2020.

Home media
Midsommar was released on Digital HD on September 24, 2019, and on DVD and Blu-ray on October 8, 2019. The director's cut of the film was then released on Blu-ray and 4K Ultra HD Blu-ray as an A24 shop exclusive on July 20, 2020, in limited copies.

Reception

Box office
Midsommar grossed $27.5million in the United States and Canada, and $20.5million in other territories, for a total worldwide gross of $48million.

In the United States and Canada, the film was projected to gross $8–10 million from 2,707 theaters over its first five days. It made $3 million on its first day, including $1.1 million from Tuesday night previews, which Deadline Hollywood called a "smashing start". It went on to debut to $10.9 million, finishing sixth at the box office; IndieWire said it was "just decent" given its estimated $8 million budget, but the film would likely find success in home media. In its second weekend, the film dropped 44% to $3.7 million, finishing in eighth, and then made $1.6 million in its third weekend, finishing in ninth.

Audience reception 
Audiences polled by CinemaScore gave the film a grade of "C+" on an A+ to F scale, while those at PostTrak gave it an average 3 out of 5 stars, with 50% saying they would definitely recommend it. According to Screen Rant writer Mark Birrell, Midsommar was "one of the most polarizing horror movies of 2019" among general audiences, while Ankur Pathak of The Huffington Post says it "divided audiences (and some critics)".

Critical response

On the review aggregator website Rotten Tomatoes, the film holds an approval rating of 83% based on 400 reviews, and an average rating of 7.6/10. The site's critical consensus reads, "Ambitious, impressively crafted, and above all unsettling, Midsommar further proves writer-director Ari Aster is a horror auteur to be reckoned with." On Metacritic, which uses a weighted average, the film has a score of 72 out of 100, based on 54 reviews, indicating "generally favorable reviews". 

John DeFore of The Hollywood Reporter described the film as the "horror equivalent of a destination wedding", and "more unsettling than frightening, [but] still a trip worth taking." Writing for Variety, Andrew Barker noted that it is "neither the masterpiece nor the disaster that the film's most vocal viewers are bound to claim. Rather, it's an admirably strange, thematically muddled curiosity from a talented filmmaker who allows his ambitions to outpace his execution." David Edelstein of Vulture praised Pugh's performance as "amazingly vivid" and noted that Aster "paces Midsommar more like an opera (Wagner, not Puccini) than a scare picture," but concluded that the film "doesn't jell because its impulses are so bifurcated. It's a parable of a woman's religious awakening—that's also a woman's fantasy of revenge against a man who didn't meet her emotional needs—that's also a male director's masochistic fantasy of emasculation at the hands of a matriarchal cult." In The New York Times, Manohla Dargis was critical of the character depth behind Dani and Christian, finding them "instructively uninteresting" and stereotypically gendered as a couple.

Eric Kohn of IndieWire summarized the film as a "perverse breakup movie," adding that "Aster doesn't always sink the biggest surprises, but he excels at twisting the knife. After a deflowering that makes Ken Russell's The Devils look tame, Aster finds his way to a startling reality check." Time Outs Joshua Rothkopf awarded the film a 5/5 star-rating, writing, "A savage yet evolved slice of Swedish folk-horror, Ari Aster's hallucinatory follow-up to Hereditary proves him a horror director with no peer."

For The A.V. Club, A. A. Dowd stated that the film "rivals Hereditary in the cruel shock department", and labelled it a "B+ effort". Writing for Inverse, Eric Francisco commented that the film feels "like a victory lap after Hereditary", and that Aster "takes his sweet time to lull viewers into his clutches ... But like how the characters experience time, its passage is a vague notion." He described the film as "a sharp portrayal of gaslighting". Richard Brody of The New Yorker said that the film "is built on such a void of insight and experience, such a void of character and relationships, that even the first level of the house of narrative cards can't stand." He added, "In the end, the subject of Midsommar is as simple as it is regressive: lucky Americans, stay home." Emma Madden in The Guardian criticised the film for its depiction of disabled characters as "monstrous", and argued it resurrects harmful horror film tropes of ableism and eugenics.

Tomris Laffly of RogerEbert.com rated the film 4 out of 4 stars, describing it as a "terrifically juicy, apocalyptic cinematic sacrament that dances around a fruitless relationship in dizzying circles". A Vanity Fair article from December 2019 reflecting on the 2010s in horror films argued that Midsommar was part of a trend of "elevated horror" along with Aster's previous Hereditary and Robert Eggers directed The Witch, and that it was an example of "horror at its best".

Accolades

Themes and analysis 

Writing in The Guardian, Steve Rose describes Midsommar as "a powerful study of grief, betrayal, breakups, and more." Rose suggests that Dani's three male companions may be seen as representing "toxic masculinity", or analogues of the three male companions in The Wizard of Oz (namely the Tin Man, Cowardly Lion and Scarecrow). Rose proposes that the film may be read as a "parable of snarky, city-smart, modern rationalism undone by primal rural values". Alternatively, he proposes that the villagers' traditions could be read as far-right, white nationalist or eugenicist.

In Vox, Alissa Wilkinson described Midsommar's story as following Dani's emotional journey and following fairy tale conventions, where Dani loses her family at the beginning and goes on to become a Queen, as with Cinderella and Snow White. The article also notes the use of imagery foreshadowing later events throughout the film. Aster himself said "We begin as Dani loses a family, and we end as Dani gains one. And so, for better or worse, [the Hårga] are there to provide exactly what she is lacking, and exactly what she needs, in true fairy tale fashion."

Monica Wolfe discussed Midsommar as reflecting themes of globalization and American imperialism in a 2022 article in the Journal of Popular Film and Television. Wolfe outlines the film's competing ideologies of femininity versus masculinity, academic knowledge versus folk knowledge, and capitalism versus communism, writing that "the horror of the film is driven by the objectified Other’s resistance to the imperial power’s desire to dominate physical place and own ideological space, but is complicated by a suggestion that, in this unique case, the Other is also a nationalist, right-wing power, and the tension between home and foreign reflects that of a new Cold War."

The film's central sex scene, between Christian and Maja, has been the subject of debate as to whether it depicts rape. An article in Sexuality & Culture asserts that "the ambiguous nature of this scene may be viewed as problematic because it blurs the line between consent and sexual assault" and that the film has implications for contemporary understandings of rape, particularly of males.

Yusuke Narita, a Japanese professor at Yale University, positively cited a scene in the film where an elderly person is forced to jump off a cliff. Narita used this as an example of "mass suicide" or "mass seppuku", which he claimed was the only way to solve the aging crisis in Japan. The comments resulted in a major controversy but also resulted in Narita becoming a popular figure among some young Japanese people.

See also
 The Wicker Man, a 1973 British folk horror film revolving around a pagan cult.

References

External links

 
 
 
 

2019 horror films
2019 films
2019 independent films
American horror films
American independent films
Swedish horror films
Swedish-language films
A24 (company) films
Fiction about familicide
Films about couples
Films about cults
Films about hallucinogens
Films about grieving
Films about human sacrifice
Films about neopaganism
Films about suicide
Films set in Sweden
Films set in the United States
Films shot in Budapest
Folk horror films
Holiday horror films
Murder–suicide in films
Religious horror films
Films directed by Ari Aster
Films about rape
Films based on European myths and legends
Films shot in Utah
Films shot in New York City
Incest in film
2010s English-language films
Psychedelic films
2010s American films
2010s Swedish films
Films about disability